Keith Johnstone (21 February 1933 – 11 March 2023) was a British and Canadian pioneer of improvisational theatre, best known for inventing the Impro System, part of which are the Theatresports. He was also an educator, playwright, actor and theatre director.

Life
Born in Devon, England, Johnstone grew up hating school, finding that it blunted his imagination and made him feel self-conscious and shy. After teaching at a working-class school in Battersea, London in the early 1950s, Johnstone was commissioned to write a play by the Royal Court Theatre in 1956. He subsequently became a play-reader, director and drama teacher there, where he chose to reverse all that his teachers had told him in an attempt to create more spontaneous actors. In the 1970s, Johnstone moved to Calgary, Alberta to teach at the University of Calgary. 

Johnstone is featured in the book Blink: The Power of Thinking Without Thinking by Malcolm Gladwell.

Johnstone died on 11 March 2023, at the age of 90.

Work
Johnstone co-founded the Loose Moose Theatre, and invented his system of training that has been influencing practice within and beyond the traditional theatre for over 50 years. His system includes formats such as "Gorilla Theatre", "Micetro" or "Maestro", and "Life Game". The latter has been seen at the National Theatre courtesy of Improbable Theatre, and on U.S. cable television.

Johnstone's work with performers comprises a vast collection of training games, exercises and lazzi. He has written two books about his system; the 1979 Impro: Improvisation and the Theatre, and the 1998 Impro For Storytellers. 

Much of Johnstone's method was developed by reversing the teaching he received as a child in postwar Britain. Whereas his teachers told him to think more, he'll tell his students to think less. 

Johnstone was known for slogans that encapsulated his philosophy of improvisation, and included:
 "You can't learn anything without failing" 
 "Please don't do your best. Trying to do your best is trying to be better than you are"
 "Go onto stage to make relationships. At least you won't be alone."
 "It's not the offer, but what you do with it."
 "Allow yourself to see the audience as interesting and attractive."

Selected publications
 1989 Impro: Improvisation and the Theatre, 
 1999 Impro For Storytellers,

Further reading
 Berney, K.A. (ed.) (1994). Johnstone, Keith, Contemporary British Dramatists, St. James Press, London, 
 Keith Johnstone, in Contemporary Dramatists, 6th ed. St. James Press, 1999.

 Reddick, Grant (2006). Keith Johnstone, Theatre 100. Calgary: Alberta Playwrights Network

Notes

References

External links
 Keith Johnstone, Keith's web page.
 Improvisation and Storytelling Workshops, Workshops based on Keith's works
 Canadian Theatre  Encyclopedia entry
 "Unscripted", Chris Wiebe, Alberta Views magazine, September 2005.
 

1933 births
2023 deaths
Improvisational theatre in Canada
British expatriates in Canada
Anglo-Scots
People from Devon
People from Calgary
Canadian theatre managers and producers
British theatre managers and producers
Canadian theatre directors
British theatre directors
Acting theorists
Academic staff of the University of Calgary